Douglas Peter Wickenheiser (March 30, 1961 – January 12, 1999) was a Canadian ice hockey player, who was drafted first overall by the Montreal Canadiens in the 1980 NHL Entry Draft.

Career
Wickenheiser was born in Regina, Saskatchewan. A superstar in Major Junior hockey with the Regina Pats, he led the Western Hockey League in goal scoring (89) during the 1979–80 WHL season, captained the Pats to a berth in the Memorial Cup, and was the CHL Player of the Year. Wickenheiser was rated by The Hockey News as the top draft prospect in 1980 and was subsequently selected first overall by the Montreal Canadiens. Many Canadiens' fans, particularly French Canadian fans who desperately wanted the club to select francophone star Denis Savard, were unhappy with the selection, and Montreal media attention soon turned negative. While Wickenheiser struggled to adjust to the NHL game, Savard (drafted third overall) would quickly become a superstar with the Chicago Blackhawks, further angering some Montreal fans.

In his fourth season with the Canadiens, the club lost patience with Wickenheiser's slow development and traded him to the St. Louis Blues. Probably his most famous moment with the Blues was during the 1985–86 playoffs in a game dubbed the "Monday Night Miracle" on May 12, 1986, when after St. Louis made a large comeback against the Calgary Flames, Wickenheiser scored the overtime winner to force a Game 7 in the Campbell Conference Finals. The Blues would however, lose the deciding game 2–1.

During his NHL career, Wickenheiser also played for the Vancouver Canucks, New York Rangers and Washington Capitals, but did not play in the NHL after the 1989-90 season, spending his last four professional seasons in the minors and overseas. In 556 games, he scored 111 goals and 165 assists.

Cancer
In August 1994, Wickenheiser had an epithelioid sarcoma (a rare form of cancer), which he had first noticed four years earlier, removed from his wrist. Three years later, in October 1997, the cancer came back and had spread to his lungs, at which point it was inoperable. He died on January 12, 1999, at the age of 37 in St. Louis. He is survived by his wife and three daughters. His life story was remembered in the book The Last Face Off: The Doug Wickenheiser Story written in March 2000 by Ted Pepple, Wickenheiser's father-in-law. The Mid-States Club Hockey Association, the governing body for high school hockey in St. Louis, named their championship trophy for small school/second division teams in his honor.

Legacy
An arena in his hometown of Regina, Saskatchewan, has been named Doug Wickenheiser Arena in his honor. The arena is located at the corner of Arnason St. and Rochdale Blvd. in the city's northwest corner.

The Doug Wickenheiser Memorial Trophy which is awarded annually by the Western Hockey League to its humanitarian of the year was renamed in 2001 in honour of Wickenheiser.

The Blues have not reissued Wickenheiser's #14 since his death, though it has not been formally retired. Blues' players wore a special helmet decal with the wick of a candle and the number 14 during parts of the 1997–98 and 1998–99 seasons. In 1999, a banner with that logo, which became the symbol of The Fourteen Fund, the official Blues charity established in his memory, was permanently placed in the rafters at the Blues' home arena, the Kiel Center (now the Enterprise Center). The emblem was worn by all NHL players in the 1999 NHL All-Star Game, and was also sold to the public for a small donation and became a popular trend among youth hockey players in St. Louis. One of the two high school state championships played at Enterprise Center is named after him.

Personal life
Wickenheiser was a cousin of former Canadian national team player and Hockey Hall of Fame inductee Hayley Wickenheiser.

Career statistics

Awards
Bob Brownridge Memorial Trophy (WHL leading scorer) - 1980
 WHL First All-Star Team – 1980

References

External links

1961 births
1999 deaths
Asiago Hockey 1935 players
Baltimore Skipjacks players
Canadian expatriate ice hockey players in the United States
Canadian ice hockey centres
Deaths from cancer in Missouri
EV Zug players
Flint Spirits players
Fort Wayne Komets players
Ice hockey people from Saskatchewan
EC KAC players
Montreal Canadiens draft picks
Montreal Canadiens players
National Hockey League first-overall draft picks
National Hockey League first-round draft picks
New York Rangers players
Peoria Rivermen (IHL) players
Regina Blues players
Regina Pats players
St. Louis Blues players
Sportspeople from Regina, Saskatchewan
Vancouver Canucks players
Washington Capitals players